The HOME Investment Partnerships Program (HOME) is a type of United States federal assistance provided by the U.S. Department of Housing and Urban Development (HUD) to states in order to provide decent and affordable housing, particularly housing for low- and very low-income Americans. It is the largest Federal block grant to states and local governments designed exclusively to create affordable housing for low-income families, providing approximately US$2 billion each year.

The program is commonly referred to as the Home Investment or Home Partnership Program, and is often operating in conjunction with other housing and other urban development programs, such as the CDBG program. Its federal identification number, or CFDA number, is 14.239.

Benefits provided
The HOME program was designed and implemented in order to increase the amount of affordable housing in the United States for its citizens, especially for those that are below the national and state poverty guidelines. It was designed with four main objectives in mind:

 Expanding the supply of decent and affordable housing in the U.S.
 Strengthening the abilities of state and local governments to design and implement strategies for achieving adequate supplies of decent, affordable housing.
 Provide financial and technical assistance to state and local governments to develop affordable low-income housing.
 Extend and strengthen partnerships among all levels of government (both local and federal) and the private sector (both for-profit and non-profit organizations) in the production and operation of affordable housing.

HOME funds can be used in a broad range of eligible activities, all with the general purpose of providing affordable housing. Nevertheless, HUD has specified certain eligible activities which all governments can perform in order to achieve the objectives listed above:

 Home purchase or rehabilitation financing assistance – In this type of activity, the HOME program may provide a down payment for the purchase of a housing unit to a financial institution, thereby reducing the monthly mortgage payment of the loan balance required by the low-income family benefited which would otherwise not be able to pay the monthly payment. This down payment can be made for the purchase of new housing or for the rehabilitation of the family's own housing unit.
 Building or rehabilitation of housing for rent or ownership – In this type of activity, HOME funds may be used to build housing units which the government would provide to low-income families. The families would either provide a monthly rent fee or may choose to purchase the housing unit for an affordable price.
 Site acquisition or improvement – In this type of activity, HOME funds may be used to purchase property which will later be developed as affordable housing unit. This activity also covers the improvement and rehabilitation of current affordable housing.
 Community Housing Development Organizations (CHDOs) – In this type of activity, governments may provide funds to non-profit organizations which are dedicated to providing housing to impoverished or low-income families, including building housing projects similar to public housing projects, providing housing to the homeless, developing affordable housing communities, among others.

Among these eligible activities, HUD has specified that governments can use funds to carry out "other reasonable and necessary expenses related to the development of non-luxury housing."

The final recipients, otherwise known as beneficiaries (e.g. citizens), must be, for the most part, low-income families. HUD has designed a general formula for which all governments must comply with when providing HOME funds to citizens, which is that the incomes of families receiving HOME assistance or funds in a specific area (city, county, etc.) must not exceed 80 percent of the area's family income median or average. In other words, if say HUD determines that a local area's median income is $25,000, then the HOME funds awarded in that area should only benefit those families with incomes less than, or equal to, 80% of $25,000 (or $20,000). HUD publishes the area median incomes plus the 80% income limits every year in its website.

Administration
The program is conducted by non-federal US governmental jurisdictions, such as states, cities, urban counties, and so forth, that receive an allocation of federal benefits from HUD. All U.S. states are automatically eligible for HOME funds, and each receives a minimum of $3 million for the program, while local governments receive a minimum of $500,000 (unless the United States Congress assigns $1.5 billion or less to the program, in which case they receive a minimum of $335,000). However, federal regulations require that every single government that receives funds must provide 25 cents on their own for every HOME dollar used.

In other words, if for example a state plans to use $1 million of HOME funds during the year, HUD will provide $750,000 (75%) while the State has to provide $250,000 (25%) for the program to achieve the $1 million in assistance goal. This compliance requirement is known as "matching", and can be achieved by either donating non-federal cash (e.g. cash from their operations and not from other federal programs), donating materials and labor, donating land or buildings, or donating any other similar resource that can help achieve the goal of providing affordable housing. however, certain areas may be excluded from this requirement or have the percentage reduced if, and only if, HUD allows such reduction or if the area suffered a Presidentially-declared disaster.

In addition to the matching requirement, HUD has established certain earmarking requirements for all governments to follow. This compliance requirements obliges state and local governments to set aside 15% of program funds awarded for providing to CHDOs (see above) and setting a limit equal to 10% of program funds awarded for administration and planning expenses (e.g. not less than 90% of total funds must be used for actual assistance, including the 15% for CHDOs).

See also
 Subsidized housing
 Section 8 (housing)
 Community Development Block Grant

References

External links
 HOME Investment Partnerships Program website
 US Department of Housing and Development website

United States Department of Housing and Urban Development
Federal assistance in the United States
Affordable housing
Housing in the United States